Ebtisam AbdulAziz is a contemporary Emirati artist and writer born and raised in Sharjah. She works with geometry and mathematics to address issues of belonging and identity through installations, performance art and other media.

Selected exhibitions 
 2014 NYU Abu Dhabi Art Gallery, Abu Dhabi, UAE 
 2014 View From Inside - Fotofest
 2014 32nd Emirates Fine Arts Society Annual Exhibition, UAE
 2013 Autobiography, The Third Line, Dubai, UAE 
 2013 Biennale, Houston, USA
 2013 Emirati Expressions, Manarat Al Saadiyat, Abu Dhabi, UAE.
 2013 The Beginning of Thinking is Geometric, Maraya Arts Centre, Sharjah, UAE
 2013 Three Generations, Sotheby’s, London UK.
 2012 Arab Express, The Mori Art Museum, Tokyo, Japan
 2012 25 years of Arab Creativity, L’institut du Monde Arabe, Paris, France
 2012 Inventing The World: The Artists as a Citizen, Benin Biennial, Kora Centre, Benin 
 2009 UAE Pavilions at 53rd Venice Biennale
 2007 Ebtisam Abdulaziz, Sharjah Contemporary Art Museum, Sharjah, UAE 
 2005 Sharjah Biennial, UAE

Collection 
Ebtisam's work is housed in several public and private collections including:
 Farook Collection
 Ministry of Culture, UAE
 Youth and Community Development, UAE
 Renault Collection, France
 Deutsche Bank AG, Germany

See also 
Emirates Fine Arts Society

References 

Emirati women artists
Emirati contemporary artists
People from the Emirate of Sharjah
Year of birth missing (living people)

Living people